Darnagul is a Baku Metro station. It was opened on 29 June 2011.

See also
List of Baku metro stations

References

Baku Metro stations
Railway stations opened in 2011
2011 establishments in Azerbaijan